The following list is a discography of production by J57, an American hip hop record producer from New York City, New York. It includes a list of songs produced, co-produced and remixed by year, artist, album and title.

Singles produced

2005

Sabac Red — The Collabo Collection Volume One
07. "Controversy Rap"

2008

Chaz Kangas — Knee Jerk Reaction
02. "Hero Of Underground Rap"

Sev Statik — Shotgun
11. "Never Fall Off"
12. "Shotgun"

Brown Bag AllStars — Brown Bag All Stars
02. "Get Up"
03. "Dinner's Ready"
05. "The Boss is Back"
06. "Raw Daddy"
09. "The City Never Sleeps"
10. "Poison Apple"
11. "Lou Reed"
14. "Robo Trippin"

2009

Critical — En Varning
B4. "Takin' Over (J57 Remix)"

Homeboy Sandman — The Good Sun
D3. "Angels With Dirty Faces"

2010

LST Da Phunky Child — Super Chrom Hifi:The Sessions
12. ""S" Auf Der Brust"

Soul Khan — Soul Like Khan
01. "6:30 A.M."
02. "Fe La Soul"
03. "Knuckle Puck" 
04. "The Place That Birthed Me"
07. "Shitted On"
08. "Suck My Dick"
12. "Minyan"
13. "Soul Like Khan"

Brown Bag AllStars — The Traveller EP
A2. "Modesty" 
B1. "Knuckle Puck" 
B2. "Lights Out"

Various Artistes — Free Shabazz
01. "Antiquarian"

Koncept — Playing Life
07. "First Time"
08. "Old Man Winters"

2011

Nitty Scott — The Cassette Chronicles
10. "No Standing Here (Snippet)"

Various Artistes — Basementality Battles Mixtape Vol. 1
12. "61 Grace"

Brown Bag AllStars — Brown Bag Season Vol. 1
1-1. "PayDro Brown Bag Season Intro" 
1-2. "The Agenda"

2012

Koncept — Awaken
02. "Too Late"
03. "Aspirations" 
04. "Getting Home" 
06. "Understanding"
07. "The Crash" 
11. "Awaken"

Homeboy Sandman — Chimera
B1. "Illuminati"

Koncept — Watch the Sky Fall EP
B1. "Aspirations"

Sene — Brooklyknight
07. "Holyday"

Denitia & Sene — Blah Blah Blah
02. "How to Satisfy" 
03. "She's Not the Only One"

DJ Modesty — Kings From Queens 2 & 2.1
1-16. "Murder In The 16 Degree (16 Bars Freestyle)"

Homeboy Sandman — First Of A Living Breed
03. "Couple Bars (Honey, Sugar, Darling, Sweetie, Baby, Boo)"
05. "Illuminati"

Gameboi — Young & Restless
07. "Emergency"
"09. Gimme Shelter"

Brown Bag AllStars — Brown Bag Season Vol. 2
04. "Say it Now" 
06. "BRWN (J57 Remix)

Nitty Scott — The Boombox Diaries Vol. 1
06. "No Standing Here (Everybody Go)"

DJ Mickey Knox — All For The Love Deluxe Edition
19. "Story To Tell Remix"

2013

G. Huff — Vacant Thoughts
01. "I Ain't Done Yet (Intro)"

Silent Knight — Busy Is My Best Friend II
10. "Craft Brewed II"

Jefferson Price — Just Assume, I'm Everywhere
01. "What You Saying Though"
02. "They Follow"
04. "Good Old Days"
05. "Persistence"

Joell Ortiz — Feel So Good
01. "Feel So Good (J57 Remix)"
02. "Feel So Good (J57 Remix Instrumental)"
05. "Feel So Good (J57 Remix 2)"

Denitia & Sene — His and Hers
08. "She's Not the Only One" 
09. How to Satisfy"

Blame One & J57 — Walk in the Sun
A1. "B.L.A.M.E.57" 
A2. "They Don't Know" 
A3. "The Movement" 
B1. "Zonin'" 
B2. "Circuit Overload"
B3. "Knowledge Wisdom Overstanding"
C1. "Just a Memory (Interlude)"
C2. "Before the Sunset" 
C3. "How Much Time's Left" 
D1. "Mad Money"
D2. "SD to BK" 
D3. "Lucid Dream"
D4. "Walk in the Sun"

Koncept — Malt Disney J57 Remix EP
01. "Oh Baby (J57 Remix)" 
02. "40 oz Spliffs (J57 Remix)" 
03. "Open Tab (J57 Remix)" 
04. "Malt Disney (J57 Remix)"

DJ Brace — The Electric Nosehair Orchestra Remixed
03. "NH9 (J57 Remix)"

2014

J57 — Wax Aesthetic
05. "Everybody's Gotta Live"

Booda French — Dreams Of Brooklyn
01. "Dreams of Brooklyn"

Homeboy Sandman — Hallways
05. "Activity"

LST Da Phunky Child — Zielkonflikt
B7. "Zielkonflikt"

2015

Brown Bag AllStars — 2014: A Year in Review
01. "What's Love (J57 Sample-Free Remix)" 
09. "The Void (J57 Sample-Free Remix)"

Westside Gunn — Hitler Wears Hermes II
A1. "Big L & Half a Mil"

Hus Kingpin & SmooVth — Splash Brothers EP
08. "Let's Get It"

Tuka — Life Death Time Eternal
A1. "L.D.T.E"

Method Man  — The Meth Lab
14. "The Purple Tape"

2016

Homeboy Sandman — Kindness for Weakness
14. "Speak Truth"

Koncept & J57 — The Fuel
01. "Porcelain" 
02. The Fuel" 
03. "Excitement" 
04. "Crazy Is Beautiful" 
05. "Live Forever" 
06. "Jump" 
07. "Patience" 
08. "Plane Ticket"

Blu & Nottz  — Titans in the Flesh
B2. "Atlantis (J57 Remix)"

Reks — The Greatest X
D4. "Intuition"

DJ Madnice — The Madnice Mixtape
04. "61 Grace"

La Coka Nostra — To Thine Own Self Be True
01. "Dark Day Road"

Q-Unique & The Brown Bag AllStars — BlaQ Coffee
02. "Let's Go"
03. "No #Tbt"
10. "If I Don't Do It"

2017

Ras Kass — Soul On Ice: Revisited
A2. "On Earth...Revisited (J57 Remix)"

2018

Jamo Gang — Jamo Gang EP
01. "This Is Jamo Gang"
02. "Go Away"
03. "Straight, No Chase"
04. "Here We Go Again" 
05. "All Eyes on Us"
06. "Welcome to the Golden Era"
07. "Jamo Gang" 
08. "The Altar"

References

Production discographies
Albums produced by J57
Hip hop discographies
Discographies of American artists